Gift Zulu (born 6 November 1992) is a Zambian footballer who plays as a defender for Nkana F.C. and the Zambia national football team.

Career

International
In May 2018, Zulu was included in Zambia's squad for the 2019 COSAFA Cup. He would go on to make his senior international debut at that tournament, playing the entirety of a 4-2 penalty victory over Malawi.

Career statistics

International

Honors

International
Zambia
COSAFA Cup Champion: 2019

References

External links

1992 births
Living people
Nkana F.C. players
Zambian footballers
Zambia international footballers
Association football defenders
Forest Rangers F.C. players